Marc Eugène Charles Ladreit de Lacharrière (born November 6, 1940) is the CEO of FIMALAC (a.k.a. Financière Marc de Lacharrière), once majority owner of credit rating agency Fitch Group from which it divested between 2015 and 2018, selling its stake to Hearst Corporation. 

On the Forbes 2016 list of the world's billionaires, he was ranked #722 with a net worth of US$2.4 billion.

Early life
Marc Ladreit de Lacharrière was born on November 6, 1940 in Nice. From 1968 to 1970, he attended the École nationale d'administration.

Career
In 1961, he started a teen magazine and sold it off a few years later. He then worked for Suez, Masson, and Valeurs Actuelles. He worked for L'Oréal for fifteen years, and was its CEO for a while. He served as the Chairman of Duff & Phelps. He is a member of the Board of Directors of Renault, L'Oréal, Gilbert Coullier Productions, Cassina, and Canal Plus. He is Honorary Chairman of the Comité national des conseillers du commerce extérieur de la France (French National Committee of Foreign Trade Advisors), and a member of the Consultative Committee of Banque de France. He is a former member of the Steering Committee of the Bilderberg Group.

In 2018, he was found guilty of misappropriating funds as part of the Fillon affair, an employment scandal involving Penelope Fillon, the wife of then French politician François Fillon. He was sentenced to eight months in prison.

Philanthropy
He sits on the Board of the American Friends of the Louvre. He helped renovate the Théâtre du Rond-Point in Paris. He is a former Vice-Chairman of Fondation Agir Contre l'Exclusion (FACE), which he co-founded with Martine Aubry. He is also a member of the Fondation Culture et Diversité, Conseil artistique des musées nationaux, Fondation Bettencourt Schueller, Fondation nationale des sciences politiques, Musée des arts décoratifs, the Société des Amis du Musée du quai Branly. In 2006, he was elected to the Académie des Beaux-Arts. In August 2010, he was named Goodwill Ambassador for the UNESCO. He is the President of the Revue des deux Mondes.

Personal life
He is divorced, with four children and has one sister, Jacqueline Hacker - de Lacharriere, married to Swiss Industrial Tycoon Manfred Hacker. She is the first women playing polo on snow and has founded the La Martina brand. .

Filmography
 2016 : Carole Matthieu (producer)
 2017 : Patients (co-producer)

See also
 List of French people by net worth

References

1940 births
Living people
People from Nice
French businesspeople
French billionaires
French philanthropists
Members of the Steering Committee of the Bilderberg Group
UNESCO Goodwill Ambassadors